The Prince George Refinery is a light oil refinery located in the city of Prince George, British Columbia, Canada owned by Tidewater Midstream & Infrastructure Ltd.  The refinery feed stock is delivered by pipeline from wells in north-eastern British Columbia. The refinery provides unleaded gasoline, seasonal diesel fuels, mixed propane and butane, and heavy fuel oil.  The refinery is fed from the Pembina Pipeline that runs from Taylor, British Columbia through Prince George ending in Kamloops.

The facility was sold by Husky Energy to Tidewater Midstream & Infrastructure Ltd. in October 2019 for $215 million.  Husky Energy had owned the facility since 1982.

External links
Tidewater Midstream & Infrastructure Ltd.

References

Oil refineries in Canada
Buildings and structures in Prince George, British Columbia
Husky Energy subsidiaries